The William Proctor House is a historic house in Arlington, Massachusetts.  The 2.5-story wood-frame house was built c. 1870, and is a rare local example of Second Empire styling.  The house was owned for many years by William Proctor, a bank teller who commuted to work in Boston.  Proctor's son, also named William, was a principal in the architectural firm of Gay & Proctor, which designed a number of Arlington landmarks.

The house was listed on the National Register of Historic Places in 1985.  It now houses professional offices.

See also
National Register of Historic Places listings in Arlington, Massachusetts

References

Houses on the National Register of Historic Places in Arlington, Massachusetts
Houses in Arlington, Massachusetts